The 3rd Local Elections were held in South Korea on 13 June 2002. The ruling Millennium Democratic Party was defeated by the opposition Grand National Party, only controlled Gwangju, Jeolla and Jeju.

Metropolitan city mayoral elections

Seoul

Incheon

Daejeon

Gwangju

Daegu

Busan

Ulsan

Gubernatorial elections

Gyeonggi

Gangwon

North Chungcheong

South Chungcheong

North Jeolla

South Jeolla

North Gyeongsang

South Gyeongsang

Jeju

Provincial-level council elections

Summary

Constituency seats

Proportional representation seats

Municipal-level mayoral elections

Summary

By region

Municipal-level council elections 
3,459 seats in municipal-level councils were contested by candidates running as independents.

References 

2002
2002 elections in South Korea